Tregony, sometimes in the past Tregoney, is a village and former civil parish, now in the parish of Tregony with Cuby, in Cornwall, England, United Kingdom. It lies on the River Fal. In the village there is a post office (now closed and located in the shop), shop, a sports and social club and two churches. Tregony has bus links to the nearest city, Truro. Cornelly parish was united with Tregony in 1934. On 1 April 2021 the parish was abolished and merged with Cuby to form "Tregony with Cuby". Tregony was once a port, but clay mining upriver in St Austell has caused the river to become silted over. The population was 768 in 2011 with nearly 15% claiming Cornish identity.

History

The manor of Tregony was recorded in the Domesday Book (1086) when it was held by Frawin from Robert, Count of Mortain. Its earliest known spelling was Trefhrigoni, in 1049. There was 1 hide of land and land for 5 ploughs. There were 2 ploughs, 5 serfs, 3 villeins, 6 smallholders, 12 acres of woodland, 100 acres of pasture, 3 cattle, 40 sheep and 20 goats. The value of the manor was 15 shillings though it had formerly been worth 25 shillings.

Tregony used to be considered a town, and the rotten borough of Tregony elected two members to the Unreformed House of Commons, until the Reform Act 1832 abolished its representation as a rotten borough. At that time the parishes of Tregony and Cuby were united. The arms of the borough of Tregony were A pomegranate Or slipped and leaved Vert.

Tregony was the birthplace of the Anglican churchman Archer Thompson Gurney. The Trewarthenick Estate in the hamlet of Trewarthenick in Cornelly parish, was the birthplace of William Gregor, a geologist-clergyman who discovered titanium. Captain William Hennah RN, who took part in the Battle of Trafalgar retired to Tregony and died there.

Churches and schools
The Church of St James at Tregony was founded in the 11th century but in the early 16th century it was abandoned as it had been submerged by the tidal river. (This was caused by the building of Tregony Bridge ca. 1300 which led to the accumulation of alluvial deposits on the riverbed.) The church valuables were removed to Cuby Church sometime between 1530 and 1553: for many years thereafter the building was quarried for stone and no remains were to be seen by the early 20th century. The church had been founded by the Norman family of Pomeroy whose castle stood here: nearby there were also in mediaeval times a priory and a chapel of St Anne. There are no remains of any of these buildings either.

Since the parish lost its church, the parishioners have used Cuby Church instead. The other active church in Tregony is one of the few remaining independent Congregational churches—those that did not become part of the United Reformed Church. The former Methodist Church still has a small wooden sign on it but is now a private home.

It has a primary school in Back Lane. The area's secondary school, The Roseland Academy (built in 1962), is just over the Parish of Tregony boundary and has recently had a brand new sports hall. It has also achieved specialist school status in Music with English and IT.

The almshouses were built in 1696 and rebuilt in 1895.

Cornelly church

The parish of Cornelly near Tregony has a church but no village: it is now grouped with Tregony and 
Cuby. Cornelly church is dedicated to St Cornelius and was built in the 13th century: the upper part of the tower, the south porch and the windows of the south wall are 15th century additions. The font is probably 16th century but of very crudely carved granite; the pulpit is painted with coats of arms; a monument to Jane Reeves, 1783, has an excellent portrait bust of her.

See also
 People from Tregony

References

External links
 
 

Villages in Cornwall
Former civil parishes in Cornwall
Manors in Cornwall